The  2018–19 season will be the 48th season of competitive football by Astra Giurgiu. Astra Giurgiu will compete in the Liga I and in Cupa României.

Previous season positions

Competitive

Liga I

The Liga I fixture list was announced on 5 July 2018.

Regular season

Table

Results summary

Results by round

Matches

Championship round

Table

Results summary

Position by round

Matches

Cupa României

Astra Giurgiu will enter the Cupa României at the Round of 32.

See also

 2018–19 Cupa României
 2018–19 Liga I

References

FC Astra Giurgiu seasons
Astra, Astra Giurgiu